The Lincolnshire loop line was a  double-track railway built by the Great Northern Railway, that linked Peterborough to Lincoln via Spalding and Boston.

History
The Lincolnshire loop line was authorised on 26 June 1846 as part of the London and York Railway bill. The then renamed Great Northern Railway purchased the Witham Navigation and all navigation rights the same year and began construction of the new line, partly beside the river, in 1847. The line opened in 1848 and was for a short period the main route to the north and Scotland until the line from Peterborough to Retford was opened in August 1852. Followed by the section from Boston to Spalding and finally from Lincoln to Woodhall Junction as well as to Firsby and Horncastle.

Route

This section is the only part of the line that remains in operation, although most of the stations have long been closed and disused.

Six stations, Gainsborough Lea Road, Saxilby, Lincoln, Boston, Spalding and Peterborough North remain open, and are still part of the national network.

List of railway stations 

Gainsborough – line and station open.
Lea – line open; station site closed.
Stow Park – line open; station site closed.
Saxilby – line and station open.
Lincoln Central – line and station open.
Washingborough – closed and disused.
Five Mile House – closed and disused.
Bardney – closed and disused.
Southrey – closed and disused.
Stixwould – closed and disused.
Woodhall Junction – closed and disused.
Tattershall – closed and disused.
Dogdyke – closed and disused.
Langrick – closed and disused.
Boston – line and station open.
Kirton – line and station site lost under bypass.
Algarkirk and Sutterton – line lost under bypass, former station building still stands near A16/A17 Sutterton roundabout.
Surfleet – line and station site lost under bypass.
Spalding – line and station open.
Littleworth – line open; station site closed.
St. James Deeping – line open; station site closed.
Peakirk – line open; station site closed.
Peterborough – line and station open.

Present day

The line from Lincoln to Woodhall Junction now forms part of National Cycle Route 1, and is known as Water Rail Way. From Woodhall Junction to Boston, the entire line is private and has no permissive paths or access. From Boston to Spalding, the line is occupied by the A16. At Spalding, the line is still open to Peterborough.

References

Rail transport in Lincolnshire
Closed railway lines in the East of England
Railway lines opened in 1848
Railway lines closed in 1963